Frank Olijve (born 7 March 1989) is a Dutch professional footballer who plays as a midfielder for SV Spakenburg. He formerly played for FC Groningen, PEC Zwolle, FC Emmen, Orange County SC and De Graafschap.

Career statistics

External links
 
 Voetbal International profile

References

Living people
1989 births
Association football midfielders
Dutch footballers
Footballers from Amsterdam
FC Groningen players
PEC Zwolle players
FC Emmen players
Orange County SC players
De Graafschap players
SV Spakenburg players
Eredivisie players
Eerste Divisie players
USL Championship players
Tweede Divisie players